Coccolithus is a genus of unicellular haptophytes.

Species 

The species in this genus include:
Coccolithus oceanicus
Coccolithus pelagicus
Coccolithus pliopelagicus

References

External links 
Images of Coccolithus at Algaebase

Haptophyte genera